Joel Edwards Rogers is an American academic and political activist. Currently a professor of law, political science, public affairs and sociology at the University of Wisconsin–Madison, he also directs the Center on Wisconsin Strategy and its projects, including the Center for State Innovation, Mayors Innovation Project, and State Smart Transportation Initiative. Rogers is a contributing editor of The Nation.

Rogers has written widely on American politics and public policy, political theory, labor relations, and economic development and has helped found and run many progressive organizations. In 1997, in Timmons v. Twin Cities Area New Party, the U.S. Supreme Court ruled 6–3 against his attempt to declare state prohibitions on "fusion" or "plural nomination"—in which a candidate may be nominated by more than one party—unconstitutional. A MacArthur Foundation "genius" fellow, he has been identified by Newsweek as one of 100 Americans most likely to affect U.S. politics and culture in the 21st century.

Books 
 
 
 
 
  with Paul Q. Hirst, Claus Offe, Jane Mansbridge, Andrew Szasz, Andrew Levine, Philippe C. Schmitte, Wolfgang Streeck, Ira Katznelson, Ellen M. Immergut, Iris Marion Young, and Heinz Klug.
 
Rogers, Joel; Erik Olin Wright (2015). American Society: How It Really Works. New York: W.W. Norton & Company.

References 

 

Living people
American legal scholars
MacArthur Fellows
Radical centrist writers
Princeton University alumni
Yale Law School alumni
University of Wisconsin–Madison faculty
Year of birth missing (living people)